Hooked is the fifth full-length studio album by the American hard rock band Great White, released in 1991. Though lacking a recognizable hit single and not as commercially successful as ...Twice Shy, it still managed to peak at No. 18 on the Billboard 200 album chart. The album was certified Gold in April 1991 and was the band's last to feature bassist Tony Montana.

In Q Magazine 's Jeff Clark-Meads described the album as "relaxed, mellow and endearing - though this is likely to engender disappointment for those who hitherto considered Great White a metal act."

Cover art 
The original album cover art was photographed by famous fashion photographer John Scarpati and features a nude female model (Kristine Rose) being hoisted out of the sea by a large hook. The cover was judged too risque by the label and replaced by art director Hugh Syme shortly after the initial pressing with an alternative cover that has the hook still below the sea level and the model partially submerged, so that only her head and arms are visible.

Desert Moon 
The song "Desert Moon" was a minor hit and on February 20, 2003, was Great White's live opening song during which pyrotechnics ignited The Station nightclub fire, killing 100 people, including the band’s then-lead guitarist Ty Longley. The band did not perform "Desert Moon" live for six years after the fire, but as of 2009, they have resumed performing the song again.

The initial Japanese pressing retained the original cover, and added a bonus CD entitled Live in New York, recorded at Electric Lady Studios on May 31, 1991.

Track listing

Japanese 2005 remastered edition bonus tracks

Live in New York

Personnel

Band members 
Jack Russell – lead and backing vocals
Mark Kendall – guitars, backing vocals
Michael Lardie – guitar, keyboards, backing vocals, producer, arrangements, engineer
Tony Montana – bass
Audie Desbrow – drums

Additional musicians 
Alan Niven – backing vocals, producer, arrangements
Michael Thompson – slide guitar solo on track 3
Simone Shook – backing vocals
Terry Sasser – backing vocals

Production 
Melissa Sewell – engineer
George Marino – mastering
Hugh Syme – art direction, design

Charts

Weekly charts

Year-end charts

Singles 

Congo Square

Desert Moon

Call It Rock 'n' Roll

Certifications

References

External links 
John Scarpati official website

1991 albums
Capitol Records albums
Great White albums